Auguste L. "Gustl" French (1909 – 2004) was an Austrian-American painter, printmaker and photographer.

Biography 
She was born and educated in Vienna, Austria,  receiving a doctorate in modern philology from the University of Vienna. While in Europe, she studied with Oskar Kokoschka.

She came to the United States in 1944, fleeing the Bombing of Vienna during World War II. She taught at Baylor University in Waco, Texas, and moved to California in the mid-1950s with her family. There she studied in Oakland at the California College of Arts and Crafts (now California College of the Arts), and at the Claremont Graduate University in the M.F.A. Program.

References 

1909 births
2004 deaths
Artists from Vienna
Austrian emigrants to the United States
Austrian photographers
Austrian women photographers
20th-century American photographers
Austrian painters
20th-century Austrian women artists
20th-century American painters
American women painters
20th-century American women photographers
21st-century American painters
21st-century American women